The Best of Sharon O'Neill is the third compilation album from New Zealand born, Australian pop singer Sharon O'Neill. The album features 18 of O'Neill's greatest hits in chronological order. The album was released by Sony Music Australia on 4 September 2005.

On the album sleeve O'Neill wrote: "Now I feel is the perfect time to look back on all the wonderful projects I've been involved with and I hope those of you who have shared my journey will enjoy this collection and it's diversity".

Background and release
Sharon O'Neill was one of the biggest pop/rock artists of the late 1970s and early 1980s in New Zealand and Australia. This album is the first ever comprehensive overview of O'Neill's recording career with tracks from all three labels, CBS, Polygram Records and ABC.

The album was released to coincide with O'Neill supporting role in Leo Sayer's concert series.

Track listing

Release history

References

2005 compilation albums
Compilation albums by Australian artists
Sharon O'Neill albums